|}

The Festival Stakes is a Listed flat horse race in Great Britain open to horses aged four years or older.
It is run at Goodwood over a distance of 1 mile 1 furlong 197 yards (1,991 metres), and it is scheduled to take place each year in May.

Until 1996 the race was known as the Clive Graham Stakes, after the racing journalist (also known as "The Scout" of the Daily Express).

Winners

See also 
Horse racing in Great Britain
List of British flat horse races

References

 Paris-Turf:
Racing Post:

Open middle distance horse races
Goodwood Racecourse
Flat races in Great Britain